Orbit spectrum, also known as satellite spectrum, is a segment of a radio spectrum that became available when satellites are placed into orbit. This spectrum is a limited resource for every country. In order to ensure optimum utilization of orbit spectrum, the national administrations of countries worldwide undertake regular monitoring exercises. This orbit spectrum is used by service providers to implement satellite broadcasting, communication satellite, and weather satellite services. To ensure quality of services, this orbit spectrum must be used by service providers according to the terms and conditions approved by the respective government. Regulatory measures must be enforced. This practice of regulating the spectrum within the limits of permissions or licenses is part of spectrum management.

Missions
Orbit spectrum requires management which in turn needs effective spectrum monitoring exercises to enforce regulatory measures for ensuring legal usage of spectrum resource. Many examples of such spectrum monitoring exercises were undertaken by different countries around the world.

India
Satellite spectrum usage is governed through specific technical and financial terms and conditions laid down in the licenses issued by the Indian government, as per the provisions of  Indian Telegraphy Act 1885 and Indian Wireless Telegraphy Act 1933.

External links 
 

Satellite television
Radio spectrum